The Steinettes were an a cappella doo-wop street quartet from Greenwich Village, New York, formed in 1978.  The group appeared in HealtH and Popeye, two films from director Robert Altman that saw release in the early 1980s.

Career
Consisting of four actresses— Julie Janney, Diane Shaffer, Nathalie Blossom and Patty Katz— the Steinettes were formed in 1978 during a production at the Westbeth Theater.  Another a cappella group, the Great American Dream, had been formed at this venue.  Early on in their tenure, the quartet sang for donations at the Sheridan Square in Manhattan's West Village area.  Eventually, they also served as a filler act for local comedian Phil Stein,  and in 1981, they filled in for Rodney Dangerfield.

The group contributed vocal performances to the score of Robert Altman's HealtH, completed in 1979 but shelved by 20th Century-Fox for over two years.  During the shoot, they were dressed in vegetable outfits.  A year later, they also appeared in another Altman production, Popeye.

During their existence, the Steinettes appeared in commercials for television and radio, as well as in nightclubs.  In 1985, they performed backing vocals on three tracks of a self-titled album by dance artist Robey.  One of them was a version of "One Night in Bangkok" from the musical Chess, which peaked at #77 on the Billboard Hot 100 in March 1985.

Diane Shaffer, one of the Steinettes, became a playwright in 1995 with the religious piece Sacrilege.  Another member, Julie Janney, became an actor by the late 1990s, starring in shows such as Ellen and Another World.

References

External links
 
 
 
 
 

A cappella musical groups
American vocal groups
Musical groups established in 1978
Musical groups from New York City